George Rodgers VC (January 1829 – 9 March 1870) was a Scottish recipient of the Victoria Cross, the highest and most prestigious award for gallantry in the face of the enemy that can be awarded to British and Commonwealth forces.

Details
Rodgers was about 29 years old, and a private in the 71st Regiment (later The Highland Light Infantry), British Army during the Indian Mutiny when the following deed took place on 16 June 1858 at Marar, Gwalior for which he was awarded the VC:

Rodgers returned to Glasgow and died in a domestic accident. He visited his sister in order to get an alcoholic drink but was refused and told to lie down in her flat. Some time later Rodgers got up and found a bottle of sulphuric acid and thinking it was alcohol, drank it, causing his death. He was buried in a common grave in Glasgow's Southern Necropolis.

The medal
His Victoria Cross is displayed at the Museum of The Royal Highland Fusiliers, Glasgow, Scotland.

References

Monuments to Courage (David Harvey, 1999)
The Register of the Victoria Cross (This England, 1997)
Scotland's Forgotten Valour (Graham Ross, 1995)

External links
Location of grave and VC medal (Glasgow)

British recipients of the Victoria Cross
Highland Light Infantry soldiers
Military personnel from Glasgow
1829 births
1870 deaths
Indian Rebellion of 1857 recipients of the Victoria Cross
British Army personnel of the Crimean War
British military personnel of the Umbeyla Campaign
Accidental deaths in Scotland
Deaths by poisoning
Burials at the Southern Necropolis
British Army recipients of the Victoria Cross